Murray George Brown (born 10 November 1936) is a full professor (retired) at Dalhousie University. The Dalhouse University credits Murray Brown with over 50 refereed journals, conference abstracts, proceedings, and major reports. Brown holds post-retirement appointments in the College of Pharmacy and the Department of Community Health and Epidemiology at Dalhousie University.

Education
 1961 B.A. (honours) in Economics from the University of Western Ontario
 1962 M.A. in Economics from Queen's University
 1968 A.M. in Economics from the University of Chicago
 1974 Ph.D. in Economics from the University of Chicago

Awards
 Leave Fellowship from Social Sciences and Humanities Research Council of Canada in 1979
 Doctoral Research Fellowship for Centre for Health Administration Studies from University of Chicago in 1971-73
 Canada Council Doctoral Fellowship in 1967
 Tuition Fellowship from University of Chicago in 1967
 Canada Council Pre-Doctoral Fellowship (Queen's) in 1961
 Edward Blake Scholarship for Honours in Economics from University of Western Ontario in 1960

References

1936 births
Living people
Canadian economists
Academic staff of the Dalhousie University
Queen's University at Kingston alumni
University of Chicago alumni
University of Western Ontario alumni